Erynnis montana is a species of Palearctic butterfly in the family Hesperiidae (Pyrginae). It is found in China, eastern Russia (Amur), Taiwan and Japan.

The larva feeds on Quercus mongolica.

Subspecies
E. m. montana
E. m. monta Evans, 1948 - China (Yunnan)
E. m. neomontanus Murayama & Yoshisaka, 1959 - Taiwan
E. m. nigrescens (Leech, 1894) - western China

References

Erynnis
Butterflies described in 1861
Butterflies of Asia
Taxa named by Otto Vasilievich Bremer